Guatemala competed at the 2004 Summer Paralympics in Athens, Greece. The team included one man and one woman, but won no medals.

Sports

Athletics

Men's track

Women's track

See also
Guatemala at the Paralympics
Guatemala at the 2004 Summer Olympics

References 

Nations at the 2004 Summer Paralympics
2004
Summer Paralympics